Songar may refer to:
 Asisguard Songar, Turkish combat drone rotorcraft
 Songar Grange, Warwickshire
 Triazolam, by trade name Songar
 Zungar people